Mac C. Alejandre (born December 8, 1972) is a Filipino film and television director, as well as the head of The 5 Network's artist management division "Talent5" (a/k/a TV5 Talent Center).

Filmography

Television 
 For Love or Money (2013)
 Never Say Goodbye (2013)
 Nandito Ako (2012)
 Amaya (2011) 
 Endless Love (2010)
 The Last Prince (2010)
 Totoy Bato (2009)
 Joaquin Bordado (2008)
 MariMar (2007 – 08)
 Asian Treasures (2007, assistant-director)
 Sine Novela: Kung Mahawi Man ang Ulap (2007)
 Muli (2007)
 Now and Forever (2005 – 06)
 Majika (2006)
 Darna (2005)
 Joyride (2004)
 Click (1999)
 Ikaw Na Sana (1997 - 1998)

Film 
 The Annulment (2019)
 Just One Summer (2012)
 Ang Panday 2 (2011)
 In Your Eyes (2010)
 Ang Panday (2009)
 One True Love (2008)
 I Will Always Love You (2006)
 Hari ng Sablay (2005)
 Say That You Love Me (2005) 
 Let the Love Begin (2005)
 Lastikman (2004)
 Liberated 2 (2004)
 Singles (2004)
 Captain Barbell (2003)
 Liberated (2003)
 Sukdulan (2003)
 Ikaw Lamang (1999)
 Ang Lahat ng Ito'y Para Sa'Yo (1998)
 Ikaw Na Sana (1998)
 Wala Na Bang Pag Ibig? (1997)
 Isang Tanong Isang Sagot (1997)
 Dahil Tanging Ikaw (1997)
 Habang May Buhay (1996)
 Okey si Ma'am (1995)
 Campus Girls (1995)

Awards

References

External links

1972 births
Living people
Filipino film directors
Filipino screenwriters
Filipino television directors
GMA Network (company) people
TV5 Network people